The Montana Federation of Public Employees (MFPE) is a Montana labor union. Its 23,000 members make it the largest union in the state.

MFPE is a public employee union with a diverse membership embracing public school teachers and classified personnel, higher education faculty and support personnel, law enforcement, and health care workers.  MFPE is NOT a teacher union.  Half of MFPE's members serve public education, the rest work across state, county, and city governments.  MFPE is, for example,  the largest law enforcement union in the state representing correctional officers, highway patrol, probation and parole officers, deputy county attorneys, deputy county sheriffs, and city police.

History
MFPE is a union of public employees working in every Montana community in public elementary and secondary schools, public higher education, state, county, and city governments.  MFPE, however, will and has organized a relatively small number of private sector workers.

MFPE was formed in 2018 by the merger of Montana's two largest labor unions:  MEA-MFT and the Montana Public Employees Association (MPEA).

Counting 23,000 dues paying members, MFPE is the largest affiliate of the Montana State AFL-CIO, and is one of five merged state affiliates of the National Education Association(NEA) and American Federation of Teachers (AFT).

Before merger with MPEA, MEA-MFT (that was its name, not an acronym) was the result of the merger of the Montana Education Association (MEA) and the Montana Federation of Teachers (MFT) in 2000.

In 1882, seven years before statehood, Montana frontier parents and teachers formed what ultimately became MEA.  From the beginning, MEA was a union of public school educators, especially teachers, and until the middle 1970s and the adoption of the Montana collective bargaining act, public school administrators.  The 1975 Montana collective bargaining act identified school administrators as management.  As management school administrators were no longer eligible for MEA membership much less union representation.  From that point forward MEA evolved from a so-called professional association to a union of public school teachers and in time public school classified employees determined to bargain collectively for salary, fringe benefits, and working conditions.  From 1975 to 2002 a number of MEA local affiliates (and a smaller number of MFT local affiliates) exercised their lawful right to strike in communities across Montana, twice in Great Falls and Billings.  The Billings Education Association conducted the last major Montana school employee strike in 2002.

MFT first emerged in 1917 when a small group of professors at Montana State College (now the University of Montana) petitioned the newly created AFT (Chicago 1916) for affiliate status and became AFT Local 111.  Unfortunately that unit soon disappeared not to remerge until 1972 again at the University of Montana.  In the interim, AFT helped organize local AFT affiliates in union stronghold cities Butte and Anaconda and elsewhere mostly in western and southwestern Montana.  In 1936, almost forty years before the state legislature provided public employees the right to organize for collective bargaining purposes, the Butte Teachers Union negotiated the first public employee labor agreement in America with the Butte School district.  In 1972 a scattering of AFT affiliated local bargaining units organized MFT as an AFT state affiliate and chose Butte teacher Jim McGarvey as their first and as it turned out only executive director.  McGarvey continued to serve as executive director until MFT merged with MEA in 2000.

In 1971 MPEA started up as less a union than a concerted effort to organize a number of local government and state employee chapters to advocate for, protect, and enhance public employee retirement benefits.  That same year, Tom Schneider became MPEA's first executive director and served as such until he retired in 2010.  When authorized by state law to organize for collective bargaining purposes, MFPE morphed into a statewide public employee union.

For years MFT and MPEA, led by McGarvey and Schneider respectively, competed for members and bargaining units especially across state government.  For years, they made and broke promises to merge with each other.  Ultimately they never did, at least not directly.

Meanwhile MEA and MFT competed mostly for bargaining rights in school districts and Montana university system.  Each raided the other.  Where there was an opportunity to organize an unaffiliated group of education employees, each worked hard to win the bargaining unit election.  Each expended enormous time, energy, and money organizing much the same membership and raiding each others domains.  As stated above, however, MEA concentrated on public education employees while MFT in competition with MPEA also organized public employees outside education.  Even though MPEA organized classified, or non-certificated public school support personnel, it never attempted to organize public school teachers.  So, it came to pass that the public and the media viewed MEA as a teacher union, but not so much MFT, and never MPEA.  
 
Despite spirited competition for members, after MEA members elected Eric Feaver president in 1984, MEA and MFT slowly began to recognize that working against each other served no useful purpose so maybe it would be better to work together on issues dear to both of them.

The Montana State Lottery provided the first issue to push the two unions into common cause.  In 1986, Montana voters approved LR 100, a legislative referendum, creating a state lottery and directing net revenue (revenue left over after prizes, administration, and overhead) go to reduce county property taxes dedicated to public employee pensions.  As MEA had predicted, net revenue proved to be inconsequential, in the early years less than $3 million annually.  No one noticed demonstrable property tax relief spread across 56 counties.  To ramp up sales, the Montana Lottery began to run compelling ads indicating that the lottery funded public school employee retirement plans.  Feaver and McGarvey publicly objected to the lottery's misleading advertising.  But the damage was done.  In the 1989 special legislative session, in order to respond to a Montana Supreme Court decision (Helena v. State of Montana) and help fill an empty school funding bucket, the state legislature diverted lottery revenues from inconsequential property tax relief to public school funding.  Again, not a significant amount.  In 1995 in an effort to de-earmark various revenue streams, at the request of MEA, the legislature diverted net lottery revenues to the state's general fund.  Finally the 2015 and 2019 legislatures dedicated a portion (currently $2 million) of net lottery revenue (approximately $15 million) to fund STEM scholarships to Montana public colleges and universities.  In short, so far as a funding source for public employee retirement and later public schools, the lottery was a bad bet. The myth persists that teacher retirement or schools or both get plenty of money from the lottery.

In the 1991 legislature MEA and MFT jointly introduced and lobbied to a successful conclusion a bill providing hiring preference for already employed teachers and classifieds should their school districts be annexed or consolidated.  The consolidation of Clyde Park and Wilsall school districts into Shields Valley school district provoked this legislation.  Earlier Feaver and McGarvey had personally competed with each other for the bargaining rights in Clyde Park.  Clyde Park teachers chose MFT.  But organizing did not provide them the protection MEA and MFT later secured in 1991 for school employees in future consolidations or annexations. Today Shields Valley is an MFPE local bargaining unit.

In 1993 MEA and MFT successfully introduced legislation providing for a constitutional amendment directing the state fund public employee pensions on an actuarial sound basis and secure pension assets only for the purposes for which they are intended.  In November 1994, Montana voters overwhelmingly adopted the amendment (CI-25) which is now Article 8, Section 15, Montana state constitution.  Huge victory that continues to protect Montana's public employee pensions today.

As they worked together in common cause, Feaver and McGarvey built a personal friendship that compelled them both to push and pull their respective unions along toward merger.  They recognized their two unions were significantly more powerful and impactful working as one . . . so why not merge?

https://www.mfpe.org . .  . https://mfpe.org/about-mfpe/history/ . . .



In 1993, the unions held their first joint professional development conference.  A year later, the unions merged their locals in Missoula as an experiment and trial run for a possible statewide merger. With the backing of AFT president Albert Shanker and NEA president Keith Geiger, the MFT approved a resolution expressing its intent to merge in 1996. MEA followed suit a year later, and a joint merger committee was established to write a constitution develop transition procedures.

In 1998, national merger between the AFT and NEA seemed imminent.  While the AFT executive council approved the merger, delegates to the NEA Representative Assembly failed to approve merger by the necessary two-thirds majority.  This appeared to imperil the MEA-MFT merger, but Feaver and McGarvey declared their intention to merge regardless of what the parent bodies' said.  The NEA and AFT quickly established national guidelines for state and local level mergers, with the MEA-MFT merger providing the first test case.

In 1999, the unions merged their political action committees and staff.

From March 31 to April 1, 2000, 400 MEA and MFT delegates met in Helena to approve the merger, establish a dues structure, and finalize a budget for the new merged organization. Officers were elected in May.

The merged entity's first president was Feaver, and the first vice president McGarvey.

In 2001, the MEA-MFT—representing 61 percent of the votes in the Montana AFL-CIO—threw its support behind Montana AFL-CIO president Jerry Driscoll in his bid to unseat long-time incumbent Executive Secretary Don Judge.  McGarvey succeeded Driscoll as president.

In 2005, MEA-MFT organized the faculty at Montana Tech, the last major institution of higher education in the state without a union.

Leadership
The same year, McGarvey challenged Driscoll for leadership of the Montana AFL-CIO.  Driscoll's tenure had been a rocky one. He had called for discussions which could lead to enactment of a state sales tax, and he had pushed the Montana AFL-CIO board of directors to join the Western Environmental Trade Association, a pro-development coalition at odds with environmental groups.  One union had already disaffiliated from the state federation, and two more were threatening to do so. With MEA-MFT's backing McGarvey easily won election.  He subsequently retired as MEA-MFT vice president in May 2006.  Larry Nielson was elected as his replacement.

In July 2006, Feaver was elected a vice president of the AFT. McGarvey had been a long-time AFT vice president as well as chair of the union's Federation of Public Employees division. Feaver's election by AFT delegates at the AFT's biennial convention continued to give MEA-MFT a voice in the national AFT.

Political participation
MEA-MFT is one of the most prominent political and lobbying forces in the state. The union spent over $148,082 in lobbying expenses during the state's 90-day legislative session in 2006. The union spent more than PPL Montana (a power company; $146,494), the Montana Association of Realtors ($75,944), the Montana Association of Counties ($67,844), or the American Heart Association ($61,036).

References

External links
 

Trade unions established in 2000
American Federation of Teachers
Education trade unions
National Education Association
Education in Montana
Economy of Montana
2000 establishments in Montana
State wide trade unions in the United States